Salomon Sweers (15 June 1611 in Nijmegen – 2 March 1674 in Amsterdam) was a bookkeeper and a counsel for the Dutch East India Company. 
His younger brother was Admiral Isaac Sweers employed by the Admiralty of Amsterdam.

Early life

Salomon Sweers was the son of Aernout Sweerts, a member of the vroedschap, and Alida van Bronckhorst. In 1628 the family moved to Amsterdam, when his father became a representative in the East India Company.

East India period
Seventeen-year-old Salomon joined the East India Company VOC as a clerk. In 1632 Sweers left for the East, under the command of Antonie van Diemen, who protected him.

In 1638 in Batavia he married Catharina Jans, a widow from Hoorn. Together they paid a visit to their homeland. In 1640 he undertook a second journey to Batavia, being appointed to the Council of India.

Together with Antonie van Diemen, Cornelis Witsen, Cornelis van der Lijn and Joan Maetsuycker, Sweers was involved in the two expeditions of  Abel Tasman. Tasman named several islands after members of the Council, as here can be seen. In 1646 he left Batavia again, after being accused of "private trade". Frederick Coyett took charge of his goods.

Later life
In 1649 Sweers bought a house on next to Johannes van Rensselaer, Patroon of the Manor of Rensselaerswyck in the New Netherlands. In 1653 he became involved in the upbringing of Jacques Specx's children.

In 1661 his wife died. In 1662 he remarried Elisabeth Bicker, a daughter of Andries Bicker. Four years later he remarried a widow in Rotterdam.

Legacy

Sweers Island in the Gulf of Carpentaria was named by Matthew Flinders in 1802, a name it still carries. Flinders gave it this name as an honour to the Dutch who had been there before him, and hence this eight by two kilometre island is indeed named after Salomon Sweers.

The Sweers Islands in van Van Diemen's Land (Tasmania) were named by Abel Tasman in November 1642, but the exact location of these islands remains unknown. Tasman also named 'Salomon Suwers (Sweers) hoeck' or Salomon Sweers Cape on the northern coast of Lavongai (New Hanover) in the Bismarck Archipelago, north-east of Papua New Guinea during the 1642 journey, and in 1644 Tasman named the Sweers River in the Gulf of Carpentaria, Queensland, Australia. This river's probable location is Investigator Road (in which case it was not a river), the strait between Bentinck and Sweers Island, two of the South Wellesley Islands. None of these names are in use today.

References 

1611 births
1674 deaths
Bookkeepers
People from Nijmegen
Sailors on ships of the Dutch East India Company